The Yorkshire South Premier League was formed in early 2016, as part of the restructuring of club cricket in Yorkshire, and is an ECB Premier League. Of the twelve initial teams competing, seven came from the now disbanded Yorkshire ECB County Premier League (Appleby Frodingham, Barnsley, Cleethorpes, Doncaster Town, Rotherham Town, Sheffield and Phoenix United, and Sheffield Collegiate), four from the South Yorkshire Premier League (Aston Hall, Treeton, Whitley Hall and Wickersley Old Village) and one from the Central Yorkshire League (Wakefield Thornes). The League headquarters is based in Bircotes, Doncaster.

A process of promotion and relegation is in operation with the bottom two teams being replaced each season by the top two teams from the South Yorkshire Championship, as the South Yorkshire Premier League is now known.

The league winners qualify to take part in the Yorkshire Championship, together with the winners of the Bradford Premier League and the Yorkshire Premier League North, and the leading Yorkshire club in the North Yorkshire and South Durham Cricket League.

2022 Premier Division Clubs

Premier Division 
 Appleby Frodingham
 Barnsley Woolley Miners
 Cawthorne 
 Cleethorpes
 Doncaster Town
 Elsecar
 Sheffield Collegiate 
 Tickhill
 Treeton
 Wakefield Thornes
 Whiston Parish Church
 Whitley Hall

Championship 
 Aston Hall
 Barnsley Woolley Miners 2nd XI
 Conisbrough
 Green Moor Sports Club 
 Hallam
 Houghton Main
 Rockingham Colliery 
 Sheffield Collegiate 2nd XI
 Shiregreen 
 Sprotborough
 Wath
 Wickersley Old Village

Winners

Overall Performance

References

External links
 Official website
 Play-cricket website

Cricket competitions in Yorkshire
ECB Premier Leagues
English domestic cricket competitions
Cricket in South Yorkshire
Club cricket